The 2011 Cachantún Cup was a professional tennis tournament played on clay courts. It was the sixth edition of the tournament which was part of the 2011 ATP Challenger Tour. It took place in Santiago, Chile between 7 and 13 March 2011.

ATP entrants

Seeds

 Rankings are as of February 28, 2011.

Other entrants
The following players received wildcards into the singles main draw:
  Jorge Montero
  Guillermo Rivera Aránguiz
  Cristóbal Saavedra-Corvalán
  Juan Carlos Sáez

The following players received entry from the qualifying draw:
  Guillermo Hormazábal
  José Pereira
  Diego Schwartzman
  Stefano Travaglia

Champions

Singles

 Máximo González def.  Éric Prodon, 7–5, 0–6, 6–2

Doubles

 Máximo González /  Horacio Zeballos def.  Guillermo Rivera Aránguiz /  Cristóbal Saavedra-Corvalán, 6–3, 6–4

External links
Official Site
ITF Search
ATP official site

Cachantun Cup
Clay court tennis tournaments
Tennis tournaments in Chile
Cachantún Cup (ATP)
Cach
Cachantún Cup